Serena Burla (born September 27, 1982) is an American track and field athlete from St. Louis, specializing in long-distance running events.

In college, Burla was a two-time Big 12 Conference runner-up for the Missouri Tigers.

Burla competed in the 2009 IAAF World Half Marathon Championships where she finished 16th (upgraded from 17th place after suspension of Inga Abitova).

Burla won the 2013 USA Half Marathon Championships (held as part of the Houston Half Marathon).

At the 2015 World Championships in Athletics in Beijing, Burla placed 10th in the marathon with a time of 2:31:06.

Burla ran a Marathon PR of 2:26:53 to finish 4th in the 2017 Osaka Women's Marathon.

References

External links

1982 births
Living people
American female long-distance runners
American female marathon runners
World Athletics Championships athletes for the United States
21st-century American women